Iba Airport (Filipino: Paliparan ng Iba, Ilocano: Pagtayaban ti Iba)  is an airport serving the general area of Iba, located in the province of Zambales in the Philippines.  It is one of the five airports in Zambales.  It is classified as a feeder airport by the Air Transportation Office, a body of the Department of Transportation that is responsible for the operations of not only this airport but also of all other airports in the Philippines except the major international airports. Iba Airport serves as a training area for the Philippine Air Force and today, most of the traffic that goes in Iba Airport are general aviation.

Images

References

External links

 Coordinates
 List of airports in Zambales, Philippines (excluding heliports and closed airports)
 Civil Aviation Authority of the Philippines

Airports in the Philippines
Transportation in Zambales
Buildings and structures in Zambales